This is a list of notable alumni and faculty from the University of Connecticut

Alumni

Academics

Academic administrators
 Stanley F. Battle – 12th Chancellor: North Carolina A&T State University; 4th President: Coppin State University
 Raymond C. Bowen – 2nd President: La Guardia Community College; president: Shelby State Community College
Scott S. Cowen – 14th President: Tulane University
Thomas C. Duffy – former Deputy Dean: Yale School of Music
Martha Piper – 14th President: University of British Columbia
Joseph W. Polisi – 6th President: The Juilliard School
William E. Trueheart – 7th President: Bryant University
Gregory S. Woodward – 6th President: University of Hartford

Scholars and critics of literature, art and ethics
Deborah Dancy, professor of painting
Bobbie Ann Mason – literary critic and novelist
Michael North – literary critic
Tim Page – Pulitzer Prize-winning music critic
Elaine Scarry – Harvard literature professor

Scholars of law and political scientists
Edward C. Banfield – political scientist
Richard Dekmejian – political scientist
Florence Roisman – law professor

Scholars of the natural sciences

Scholars of the social sciences

Arts and entertainment

Authors, journalists and commentators

Business and industry

Civic leaders and activists
Lottie B. Scott – civic leader and African American civil rights advocate

Diplomacy, government, law, and politics

Elected officials

Judges and attorneys

Diplomats, government officials and party leaders

Foreign officials
Hajim al-Hassani – former Speaker of the Iraqi National Assembly under the Iraqi Transitional Government
Bona Arsenault – former Member: Parliament of Canada (1945–1957)
Tansu Çiller – 22nd Prime Minister of Turkey (1993–1996)

Military
Willis Nichols Hawley – United States Army First Sergeant
Samuel Jaskilka – United States Marine Corps General 
Carl Kimmons – United States Navy officer; first person to rise through the ranks from mess attendant to commissioned officer
Charles D. Luckey – United States Army Lieutenant General
Kenneth North – United States Air Force Brigadier General
Regina Rush-Kittle – United States Army Reserve Command Sergeant Major
Cornelius E. Ryan – United States Army Major General
Paul A. Yost Jr. – United States Coast Guard Commandant

Sports

Baseball

Men's basketball

Women's basketball

Football

Men's hockey
Todd Krygier – NHL left-winger.
Maxim Letunov – NHL center.
Cole Schneider – AHL and NHL right-winger.
Tage Thompson – NHL center.

Men's soccer

Women's soccer
Niki Cross – Forward for Houston Dash of the National Women's Soccer League
Rachel Hill – Forward for Orlando Pride of the NWSL
Stephanie Labbé – Olympic bronze medalist, Canadian goalkeeper
Sara Whalen (born 1976) – Olympic silver medalist

Other
Dan Cramer – mixed martial artist for Bellator and UFC Fighting Championships

Faculty

Current

Former
Note: Years and official titles are given when possible.

Presidents of the University of Connecticut

References

University of Connecticut people